Emmelichthys nitidus nitidus, the Cape bonnetmouth, is a subspecies of rover native to the Indian and Pacific oceans from South Africa to Australia and New Zealand where it is found at depths of from .  This fish can reach a length of up to  TL.  It is of minor importance to commercial fisheries.

References

Emmelichthyidae
Taxa named by John Richardson (naturalist)
Fish described in 1845